The Stockholm Japan Expo is an annual expo held in Gullmarsplan in Stockholm to showcase Japanese culture and arts. The three-day event typically runs through the last (usually fourth) Friday of the month May to the consequent Sunday.

2009
In 2009, it ran from 22 May till the 24th. The headliner for the event was Japanese rock musician, Miyavi was to perform on 23 May.

References 

Culture in Stockholm
Tourist attractions in Stockholm
Annual events in Sweden
Japanese culture
Spring (season) events in Sweden